It was also declared the International Women's Year by the United Nations and the European Architectural Heritage Year by the Council of Europe.

Events

January

 January 1 - Watergate scandal (United States): John N. Mitchell, H. R. Haldeman and John Ehrlichman are found guilty of the Watergate cover-up.
 January 2
 The Federal Rules of Evidence are approved by the United States Congress.
 Bangladesh revolutionary leader Siraj Sikder is killed by police while in custody.
 A bomb blast at Samastipur, Bihar, India, fatally wounds Lalit Narayan Mishra, Minister of Railways.
 January 5 – Tasman Bridge disaster: The Tasman Bridge in Hobart, Tasmania, Australia, is struck by the bulk ore carrier , killing 12 people.
 January 7 – OPEC agrees to raise crude oil prices by 10%.
 January 10–February 9 – The flight of Soyuz 17 with the crew of Georgy Grechko and Aleksei Gubarev aboard the Salyut 4 space station.
 January 15 – Alvor Agreement: Portugal announces that it will grant independence to Angola on November 11.
 January 19 – The 6.8  Kinnaur earthquake affected Himachal Pradesh in India with a maximum Mercalli intensity of IX (Violent), killing 47.
 January 20
 In Hanoi, North Vietnam, the Politburo approves the final military offensive against South Vietnam.
 Work is abandoned on the British end of the Channel Tunnel.
 January 24 – Jazz pianist Keith Jarrett plays the solo improvisation The Köln Concert at the Cologne Opera. The live recording becomes the best-selling piano recording in history.

February

 February 4 – The Haicheng earthquake, the first successfully predicted earthquake, kills 2,041 and injures 27,538 in Haicheng, Liaoning, China.
 February 5 – The Argentinian president Isabel Perón decrees Operativo Independencia, aiming to neutralize or annihilate the "subversive elements" in the province of Tucuman. Isabelita takes advantage to take a self-coup and assume extraordinary powers.
 February 11
 Margaret Thatcher defeats Edward Heath for the leadership of the opposition UK Conservative Party. Thatcher, 49, is Britain's first female leader of any political party.
 Colonel Richard Ratsimandrava, President of Madagascar, is assassinated.
 February 13 – A "Turkish Federated State of North Cyprus" is declared as an unsuccessful first step to international recognition of a Turkish Cypriot separatist state in Cyprus. 
 February 21 – Watergate scandal: Former United States Attorney General John N. Mitchell, and former White House aides H. R. Haldeman and John Ehrlichman, are sentenced to between 30 months and 8 years in prison.
 February 27 – The 2 June Movement kidnaps West German politician Peter Lorenz. He is released on March 4 after most of the kidnappers' demands are met.
 February 28
 A major tube train crash at Moorgate station, London kills 43 people.
 In Lomé, Togo, the European Economic Community and 46 African, Caribbean and Pacific countries sign a financial and economic treaty, known as the first Lomé Convention.
 The National Liberation Front of Angola (FNLA) approaches the South African Embassy in London and requests 40 to 50 artillery pieces to assist their cause in the Angolan Civil War.

March

 March 1 
 Aston Villa win the Football League Cup at Wembley, beating Norwich City 1–0 in the final.
 Australian television switches to full-time colour.
 March 4 – A Canadian parliamentary committee is televised for the first time.
 March 6
 Algiers Accord: Iran and Iraq announce a settlement in their border dispute.
 A bomb explodes in the Paris offices of the Springer Press. The March 6 Group (connected to the Red Army Faction) demands amnesty for the Baader-Meinhof Group.
 March 8 – The United Nations proclaims International Women's Day.
 March 9 – Construction of the Trans-Alaska Pipeline System begins.
 March 10
 Vietnam War: North Vietnamese troops attack Ban Mê Thuột, South Vietnam, on their way to capturing Saigon.
 An extended portion of Sanyō Shinkansen between Okayama Station and Hakata Station opens, thus making Shinkansen reach the second island, Kyushu, Japan.
 March 11 – The leftist military government in Portugal defeats a rightist coup attempt in head of the former president António de Spínola.
 March 13 – Vietnam War: South Vietnam President Nguyễn Văn Thiệu orders the Central Highlands evacuated. This turns into a mass exodus involving troops and civilians (the Convoy of Tears).
 March 15 – In Brazil, Guanabara State merges into the state of Rio de Janeiro. The state's capital moves from the city of Niterói to the city of Rio de Janeiro.
 March 22 – Ding-a-dong by Teach-In (music by Dick Bakker, text by Will Luikinga and Eddy Ouwens) wins the 20th Eurovision Song Contest 1975 for the Netherlands.
 March 25 – King Faisal of Saudi Arabia is shot and killed by his nephew.
 March 27 – The South African government announces that it will consolidate the 113 separate homeland areas into 36.
 March 28 – A fire in the maternity wing at Kučić Hospital in Rijeka, Yugoslavia (now Croatia), kills 25 people.
 March 31 – Süleyman Demirel of AP forms the new government of Turkey (39th government), a four-party coalition, so-called First National Front).

April

 April 4
 Vietnam War: The first military Operation Babylift flight, C5A 80218, crashes 27 minutes after takeoff, killing 138 on board; 176 survive the crash.
 Bill Gates and Paul Allen found Microsoft in Albuquerque, New Mexico.

 April 5 – The Soviet manned space mission (Soyuz 18a) ends in failure during its ascent into orbit when a critical malfunction occurs in the second and third stages of the booster rocket during staging at an altitude of 192 km, resulting in the cosmonauts and their Soyuz spacecraft having to be ripped free from the vehicle. Both cosmonauts (Vasily Lazarev and Oleg Makarov) survive.
 April 9
 Asia's first professional basketball league, the Philippine Basketball Association, plays its first game at the Araneta Coliseum.
 Eight people in South Korea, who are involved in the People's Revolutionary Party Incident, are hanged.

 April 13
 Bus massacre: The Kataeb militia kills 27 Palestinians during an attack on their bus in Ain El Remmeneh, Lebanon, triggering the Lebanese Civil War which lasts until 1990.
 A coup d'état in Chad led by the military overthrows and kills President François Tombalbaye.
 April 17 – The Khmer Republic surrenders, when the Communist Khmer Rouge guerilla forces capture Phnom Penh ending the Cambodian Civil War, with mass evacuation of American troops and Cambodian civilians. 
 April 18 – The Khmer Rouge begins a forcible mass evacuation of the city and starts the genocide.
 April 19 – Nico Diederichs becomes the 3rd State President of South Africa.
 April 20 – Taman Mini Indonesia Indah opens to the public in Jakarta, Indonesia.
 April 24 – Six Red Army Faction terrorists take over the West German embassy in Stockholm, take 11 hostages and demand the release of the group's jailed members; shortly after, they are captured by Swedish police (See West German Embassy siege).
 April 25 – Vietnam War: As North Vietnamese Army forces close in on the South Vietnamese capital Saigon, the Australian Embassy is closed and evacuated, almost 10 years to the day since the first Australian troop commitment to South Vietnam.
 April 29 – Vietnam War: North Vietnam concludes its East Sea Campaign by capturing all of the Spratly Islands that were being held by South Vietnam.
 April 30 – The Vietnam War ends with the Fall of Saigon: The Vietnam War concludes as Communist forces from North Vietnam take Saigon, resulting in mass evacuation of the remaining American troops and South Vietnam civilians. As the capital is taken, South Vietnam surrenders unconditionally and is replaced with a temporary Provisional Government.

May

 May 2 – The Khmer Rouge raids several Vietnamese towns, which eventually leads to the Cambodian–Vietnamese War. 
 May 3 – West Ham United wins the FA Cup at Wembley, beating Fulham 2–0 in the final. Both goals are scored by Alan Taylor. West Ham legend Bobby Moore, appears for Fulham.
 May 6 – The South African government announces that it will provide all Black children with free and compulsory education.
 May 15 – Mayaguez incident: The American merchant ship Mayaguez, seized by Cambodian forces, is rescued by the U.S. Navy and Marines; 38 Americans are killed.
 May 16
 Sikkim accedes to India after a referendum and abolishes the Chogyal, its monarchy.
 Junko Tabei from Japan becomes the first woman to reach the summit of Mount Everest.
 May 25 – Bobby Unser wins the Indianapolis 500 for a second time in a rain-shorted 174 lap,  race.
 May 27 – The Dibbles Bridge coach crash near Grassington, North Yorkshire, UK, results in 32 deaths (the highest toll in a United Kingdom road accident).
 May 28 – Fifteen West African countries sign the Treaty of Lagos, creating the Economic Community of West African States.

June

 June 5
 The Suez Canal opens for the first time since the Six-Day War.
 June 6 – The Georgetown Agreement, formally creating the ACP Group, is signed.
 June 7 - June 21 – The first Cricket World Cup, 1975 Cricket World Cup is held in England with West Indies defeating Australia in the final.
 June 9 – The Order of Australia is awarded for the first time.
 June 11 – After a referendum and seven years of military rule, modern day Greece is established as the Hellenic Republic.
 June 25
 Prime Minister Indira Gandhi declares a state of emergency in India, suspending civil liberties and elections.
 Mozambique gains independence from Portugal.

July

 July 1 – The Postmaster-General's Department is disaggregated into the Australian Telecommunications Commission (trading as Telecom Australia) and the Australian Postal Commission (trading as Australia Post). 
 July 4
 Zion Square refrigerator bombing. A terrorist attack in downtown Jerusalem kills 15 civilians and wounds 77.
 Sydney newspaper publisher Juanita Nielsen disappears, and is presumed to have been murdered.
 July 5 – Cape Verde gains independence after 500 years of Portuguese rule.
 July 6 – The Comoros declares and is granted its independence from France.
 July 9 – The National Assembly of Senegal passes a law that will pave way for a multi-party system (albeit highly restricted).
 July 12 – São Tomé and Príncipe declare independence from Portugal.
 July 17 – Apollo–Soyuz Test Project: A manned American Apollo spacecraft and the manned Soviet Soyuz spacecraft for the Soyuz 19 mission dock in orbit, marking the first such link-up between spacecraft from the 2 nations.

August

 The first Cuban forces arrive in Angola to join Soviet personnel who are there to assist the MPLA that controls less than a quarter of Angolan territory. In response, the United States, Zaire and Zambia request South Africa to provide training and support for the FNLA and UNITA forces.
 August 1 – The Helsinki Accords, which officially recognize Europe's national borders and respect for human rights, are signed in Finland.
 August 8 – The Banqiao Dam, in China's Henan Province, fails after Typhoon Nina; over 200,000 people perish.
 August 11 – Governor Mário Lemos Pires of Portuguese East Timor abandons the capital Dili, following a UDT coup and the outbreak of civil war between UDT and Fretilin.
 August 15
 Founder President Sheikh Mujibur Rahman of Bangladesh is killed during a coup led by Major Syed Faruque Rahman.
 Some members of Jehovah's Witnesses believe that Armageddon will occur this year based on the group's chronology and some sell their houses and businesses to prepare for the new world paradise which they believe will be created when Jesus establishes God's Kingdom on Earth.
 August 20 – Viking program: NASA launches the Viking 1 planetary probe toward Mars.
 August 24 – Officers responsible for the military coup in Greece in 1967 are sentenced to death in Athens. The sentences are later commuted to life imprisonment.
 August 25 – The Victoria Falls Conference between Rhodesian Prime Minister Ian Smith and the United African National Council is held in a South African Railways coach on the Victoria Falls Bridge, officiated by Zambian President Kenneth Kaunda and South African Prime Minister John Vorster.

September

 September–October – In New Zealand, Māori leader Whina Cooper leads a march of 5,000 people, in support of Maori claims to their land.
 September 5
 In Sacramento, California, Lynette Fromme attempts to assassinate U.S. President Gerald Ford, but is thwarted by a Secret Service agent.
 The London Hilton Hotel is bombed by the Provisional Irish Republican Army; two people are killed and 63 injured.
 September 6 – An earthquake of magnitude  kills at least 2,085 in Diyarbakır and Lice, Turkey.
 September 14 – Rembrandt's painting The Night Watch is slashed a dozen times at the Rijksmuseum in Amsterdam.
 September 15 – The French department of "Corse", comprising the entire island of Corsica, is divided into two departments: Haute-Corse (Upper Corsica) and Corse-du-Sud (Southern Corsica).

 September 16
 Papua New Guinea gains its independence from Australia.
 Cape Verde, Mozambique and São Tomé and Príncipe join the United Nations.
 September 19 – General Vasco Gonçalves is ousted as Prime Minister of Portugal.
 September 20 – The term of Tuanku Al-Mutassimu Billahi Muhibbudin Sultan Abdul Halim Al-Muadzam Shah ibni Almarhum Sultan Badlishah, as the 5th Yang di-Pertuan Agong of Malaysia, ends.
 September 21 – Sultan Yahya Petra ibni Almarhum Sultan Ibrahim Petra of Kelantan, becomes the 6th Yang di-Pertuan Agong of Malaysia.
 September 27 – Francoist Spain executes five ETA and FRAP members, the last executions in Spain to date.
 September 30 – The Hughes Helicopters (later McDonnell-Douglas, now Boeing IDS) AH-64 Apache makes its first flight.

October

 October 1 – Thrilla in Manila: Muhammad Ali defeats Joe Frazier in a boxing match in Manila, Philippines.
 October 14 
 The South African Defence Force invades Angola during Operation Savannah in support of the FNLA and UNITA prior to the Angolan elections scheduled for November 11.
 An RAF Avro Vulcan bomber explodes and crashes over Żabbar, Malta after an aborted landing, killing five crew members and one person on the ground.
 October 16
 The "Balibo Five" Australian television journalists are killed at Balibo by Indonesian Army special forces in the buildup to the Indonesian invasion of East Timor.
 The last naturally occurring case of smallpox is diagnosed and treated, the victim being two-year-old Rahima Banu.
 October 30 - Juan Carlos I of Spain becomes acting head of state after General Francisco Franco concedes that he is too ill to govern. His death on November 20 effectively marks the end of the dictatorship established following the Spanish Civil War and the beginning of Spain's transition to democracy.
 October 31
 The Racial Discrimination Act 1975 takes effect in Australia.
 Tun Mustapha resigned as Chief Minister of Sabah, a state in Malaysia, bringing to an end speculation that he would attempt to lead secession for Sabah to become an independent nation.

November

 November 6 – The Green March begins: 300,000 unarmed Moroccans converge on the southern city of Tarfaya and wait for a signal from King Hassan II of Morocco to cross into Western Sahara.
 November 7 – A vapor cloud explosion at a petroleum cracking facility in Geleen, Netherlands, leaves 14 dead and 109 injured, with fires lasting for five days.
 November 10 
 United Nations General Assembly Resolution 3379: By a vote of 72–35 (with 32 abstentions), the United Nations General Assembly approves a resolution equating Zionism with racism. The resolution provokes an outcry among Jews around the world. It is repealed in 1991.
 The -long freighter  sinks during a storm  from the entrance to Whitefish Bay on Lake Superior, killing all 29 crew members on board (an event immortalized in song by Gordon Lightfoot).
 Lev Leshchenko revives Den Pobedy, one of the most popular World War II songs in the USSR.
 November 11
 Angola becomes independent from Portugal and civil war erupts.
Australian constitutional crisis of 1975: Governor-General of Australia Sir John Kerr controversially dismisses the Whitlam Labor Government and commissions Malcolm Fraser of the Liberal/National Country Coalition as caretaker Prime Minister.
 The first annual Vogalonga rowing "race" is held in Venice, Italy.
November 12 – The Comoros joins the United Nations.
November 14 – Madrid Accords: Spain agrees to hand over power of the Spanish Sahara to Morocco and Mauritania by the end of February 1976.
November 15 – The "Group of 6" industrialized nations (G-6) is formed and helds its 1st summit at the Château de Rambouillet in France.
November 16 – Beginning of the Third Cod War between UK and Iceland, which lasts until June 1976.
November 19 – The United States Congress approves the Clark Amendment, ending aid to the FNLA and UNITA.
November 20 – Former California Governor Ronald Reagan enters the race for the Republican presidential nomination, challenging incumbent President Gerald Ford.
November 22 – Juan Carlos is declared King of Spain following the death of General Francisco Franco; he would reign until his abdication in 2014.

 November 25 – Suriname gains independence from the Kingdom of the Netherlands.
 November 27 - The Jaws film is released in Australia by Steven Spielberg, based on Peter Benchley’s novel of the same name.
 November 28
 Portuguese Timor declares its independence from Portugal as East Timor.
 November 29
 The name "Micro-soft" (for microcomputer software) is used by Bill Gates in a letter to Paul Allen for the first time (Microsoft becomes a registered trademark on November 26, 1976).
 While disabled, the submarine tender  discharges radioactive coolant water into Apra Harbor, Guam. A Geiger counter at two of the harbor's public beaches shows 100 millirems/hour, 50 times the allowable dose.
 1975 New Zealand general election: The New Zealand National Party led by Robert Muldoon defeats the incumbent New Zealand Labour Party led by Prime Minister Bill Rowling.

December

 December 2 – In Laos, the communist party of the Pathet Lao takes over Vientiane and defeats the Kingdom of Laos, forcing King Sisavang Vatthana to abdicate and creating the Lao People's Democratic Republic. This ends the Laotian Civil War, with mass evacuation of American troops and Laotian civilians, but effectively begins the ongoing Insurgency in Laos with the Pathet Lao fighting the Hmong people, Royalist-in-exile and the Right-wings.
 December 7 – Indonesian invasion of East Timor: Indonesia invades East Timor; the occupation continues until 1999, when U.N. peacekeepers take over control until 2002.
 December 13
 1975 Australian federal election: The Liberal/National Country Coalition led by Malcolm Fraser defeats the recently dismissed Labor Government led by Gough Whitlam. The Fraser Government achieves what is so far the largest parliamentary majority in federal Australian political history. Whitlam would subsequently survive a leadership challenge against him.
 United Nations Convention on the Reduction of Statelessness (1961) comes into effect.
 December 18 – The Algerian president Houari Boumediene orders the expulsion of all Moroccans from Algeria.
 December 21 – Six people, including Carlos the Jackal, kidnap delegates of an OPEC conference in Vienna.
 December 29 – A bomb explosion at LaGuardia Airport in New York City kills 11 people.

Date unknown
 The Spanish Army quits Spanish Sahara (modern-day Western Sahara), last remnant of the Spanish Empire. The Sahrawi Republic (RASD) is created. Morocco invades the former territory.
 The government of Colombia announces the finding of Ciudad Perdida.
 Benoit Mandelbrot coins the mathematical term fractal.
 Victoria (Australia) abolishes capital punishment.
 South Australia becomes the first Australian state to decriminalize homosexual acts between consenting adults.
 The first monster truck, Bigfoot, is created by Bob Chandler.

World population

Births

January

 January 1
 Sonali Bendre, Indian actress
 Eiichiro Oda, Japanese manga artist
 January 2 
 Dax Shepard, American actor 
 Oleksandr Shovkovskiy, Ukrainian footballer
 Vladyslav Vashchuk, Ukrainian footballer
 Robert Westerholt, Dutch musician
 January 3 
 Danica McKellar, American actress and education advocate
 Jason Marsden, American actor
 Thomas Bangalter, French musician and record producer
 January 5 – Bradley Cooper, American actor
 January 6
 Yukana, Japanese voice actress
 Laura Berg, American softball player and coach
 Ricardo Santos, Brazilian beach volleyball player
 January 5 – Rob Waddell, New Zealand rower
 January 9 – James Beckford, Jamaican athlete
 January 11 – Matteo Renzi, 56th Prime Minister of Italy 
 January 13 – Andrew Yang, American entrepreneur, founder of Venture for America, and 2020 Democratic presidential candidate
 January 15 – Mary Pierce, French tennis player
 January 17 – Tony Brown, New Zealand rugby union footballer
 January 23 – Tito Ortiz, American mixed martial arts fighter
 January 25
 Mia Kirshner, Canadian actress
 Tim Montgomery, American athlete
 January 28
 Tanya Chua, Singaporean singer
 Hiroshi Kamiya, Japanese voice actor and singer 
 January 29 – Sara Gilbert, American actress
 January 30 – Juninho Pernambucano, Brazilian footballer
 January 31 – Preity Zinta, Indian actress and entrepreneur

February

 February 1 – Big Boi, American rapper
 February 2
 Todd Bertuzzi, Canadian hockey player
 Ieroklis Stoltidis, Greek footballer
 February 3 – Brad Thorn, New Zealand-Australian rugby player
 February 4 – Natalie Imbruglia, Australian actress and singer
 February 5 – Giovanni van Bronckhorst, Dutch footballer and coach
 February 9 – Vladimir Guerrero, Dominican baseball player
 February 10 – Hiroki Kuroda, Japanese baseball pitcher  
 February 14 – Malik Zidi, French actor
 February 17
 Harisu, South Korean singer, model and actress
 Todd Harvey, Canadian hockey player
 Kaspars Astašenko, Latvian ice hockey player (d. 2012)
 Václav Prospal, Czech hockey player
 February 18
 Igor Dodon, President of Moldova
 Keith Gillespie, Northern Irish footballer
 Gary Neville, English footballer
 February 19 
 Mohamed Aly, Egyptian boxer
 Esther de Lange, Dutch politician
 February 20 – Brian Littrell, American pop singer 
 February 22 – Drew Barrymore, American actress and film producer
 February 23
 Mike Flood, American politician
 Wilfred Kibet Kigen, Kenyan long-distance runner
 Callan Mulvey, New Zealand-born Australian actor
 February 25 – Chelsea Handler, American comedian and television host
 February 26 – Carolina Gómez, Colombian actress and model

March

 March 1 – Valentina Monetta, Sammarinese singer
 March 3
Khadaffy Janjalani, Filipino terrorist
Patric Chiha, Austrian film director and screenwriter
 March 5 – Jolene Blalock, American actress
 March 6 – Aracely Arámbula, Mexican actress, singer and model
 March 7 – Hanan Tork, Egyptian actress and ballerina dancer
 March 9
 Roy Makaay, Dutch footballer
 Lisa Miskovsky, Swedish musician
 Juan Sebastián Verón, Argentine footballer
 March 10 – Jamie Arnold, American-Israeli basketball player
 March 11
 Buvaisar Saitiev, Chechen wrestler
 David Cañada, Spanish cyclist (d. 2016)
 March 12 – Kéllé Bryan, English singer
 March 15
 Eva Longoria, American actress
 Veselin Topalov, Bulgarian chess player
 will.i.am, American rapper and singer
 March 17 
 Natalie Zea, American actress
 Puneeth Rajkumar, Indian actor, singer, and producer (d. 2021)
 March 18 – Sutton Foster, American actress
 March 19
 Vivian Hsu, Taiwanese singer, actress and model
 Le Jingyi, Chinese swimmer
 March 21
 Fabricio Oberto, Argentinian-Italian basketball player
 Mark Williams, Welsh professional snooker player
 March 22 
 Guillermo Díaz, American actor
 Cole Hauser, American actor
 March 24 – Thomas Johansson, Swedish tennis player
 March 25
 Ladislav Benýšek, Czech ice hockey player
 Melanie Blatt, English singer
 March 27 
 Fergie, American singer and actress
 Mihaela Melinte, Romanian hammer thrower
 March 28 
 Iván Helguera, Spanish footballer
 Richard Kelly, American director 
 March 29 – Jan Bos, Dutch speed skater
 March 31 – Mirtha Vásquez, Peruvian politician and lawyer, former Prime Minister of Peru

April

 April 1 
 Magdalena Maleeva, Bulgarian tennis player
 Kristine Quance, American swimmer
 April 2
 Nate Huffman, American basketball player (d. 2015)
 Pedro Pascal, Chilean-American actor
 Adam Rodriguez, American actor
 April 3 – Koji Uehara, Japanese baseball pitcher
 April 4 – Delphine Arnault, French businesswoman and entrepreneur
 April 5 
 John Hartson, Welsh footballer
 Juicy J, American rapper, songwriter, and record producer
 April 6
 Zach Braff, American actor
 Sónia Lopes, Cape Verdean runner
 April 8 – Anouk, Dutch singer-songwriter and producer
 April 9 
 Robbie Fowler, English footballer
 Bertine Zetlitz, Norwegian singer
 April 10 – David Harbour, American actor
 April 11 – Dariusz Kozubek, Polish footballer
 April 13 
 Jasey-Jay Anderson, Canadian snowboarder
 Tatiana Navka, Ukrainian born-Russian Ice dancer
 April 14
 Tino Chrupalla, German politician
 Amy Dumas, American professional wrestler
 Anderson Silva, Brazilian UFC fighter
 April 15 – Paul Dana, American racing driver (d. 2006)
 April 16 – Sean Maher, American actor
 April 17 – Lee Hyun-il, South Korean badminton player
 April 19 – Jussi Jääskeläinen, Finnish football player and coach
 April 21 – Danyon Loader, New Zealand swimmer
 April 22
 Greg Moore, Canadian racing driver (d. 1999)
 Carlos Sastre, Spanish road bicycle racer
 April 26 – Joey Jordison, American metal drummer (d. 2021)
 April 27 – Kazuyoshi Funaki, Japanese ski jumper
 April 30 
 Johnny Galecki, Belgian-born American actor
 Annika Strandhäll, Swedish politician

May

 May 1 – Marc-Vivien Foé, Cameroonian footballer (d. 2003)
 May 2
 David Beckham, English footballer
 Ahmed Hassan, Egyptian footballer 
 May 3
 Andreea Bibiri, Romanian actress and theatre director
 Christina Hendricks, American actress
 May 7 – Roxana Maracineanu, Romanian born-French politician and swimmer
 May 8
 Enrique Iglesias, Spanish singer
 Jussi Markkanen, Finnish hockey player
 May 9 – Chris Diamantopoulos, Canadian actor
 May 10
 Hazem Emam, Egyptian footballer
 Hélio Castroneves, Brazilian racing driver
 May 12
 Jonah Lomu, New Zealand rugby player (d. 2015)
 Jared Polis, American politician, 43rd Governor of Colorado
 May 13 – Itatí Cantoral, Mexican actress
 May 15
 Ray Lewis, American football player
 Janne Seurujärvi, Finnish Sami politician, and the first Sami to be elected to the Finnish Parliament.
 May 16
 Tony Kakko, Finnish singer
 Simon Whitfield, Canadian triathlete
 May 18
 John Higgins, Scottish snooker player
 Jack Johnson, American singer-songwriter
 Irina Karavayeva, Russian trampolinist
 May 19
 Jonas Renkse, Swedish musician 
 Dorit Bar Or, Israeli actress
 Masanobu Ando, Japanese actor
 Zhang Ning, Chinese badminton player
 May 20
 Al Bano, Italian singer
 Tahmoh Penikett, Canadian actor
 May 21 – Anthony Mundine, Australian rugby league player and boxer
 May 22 – Janne Niinimaa, Finnish hockey player
 May 25 
 Keiko Fujimori, Peruvian politician
 Lauryn Hill, American singer
 May 27
 André 3000, American musician, record producer, and actor
 Jamie Oliver, English chef, restaurateur and television personality
 May 28 – Charmaine Sheh, Hong Kong actress
 May 29
 David Burtka, American actor and professional chef
 Mel B, English singer, songwriter, rapper, television personality, actress and author
 Daniel Tosh, American comedian
 May 30
 CeeLo Green, African-American singer-songwriter, pianist, producer, and actor
 May 31 – Toni Nieminen, Finnish ski jumper

June

 June 1 
 Nikol Pashinyan, Armenian politician, Prime Minister of Armenia
 Frauke Petry, German politician
 June 4
 Russell Brand, English actor and comedian
 Angelina Jolie, American actress
 June 7
 Shane Bond, New Zealand fast bowler
 Allen Iverson, American basketball player
 Ekta Kapoor, Indian actress
 June 8 – Shilpa Shetty, Bollywood actress
 June 9
 Andrew Symonds, British-born Australian cricketer (d. 2022)
 Ameesha Patel, Indian actress and model
 June 11 – Choi Ji-woo, South Korean actress and model
 June 15 – Elizabeth Reaser, American actress
 June 16 – Anabel Conde, Spanish singer
 June 18 – Martin St. Louis, Canadian hockey player
 June 19
 Oksana Chusovitina, German artistic gymnast
 Anthony Parker, American basketball player
 Ed Coode, British rower
 June 23 – KT Tunstall, Scottish singer-songwriter
 June 24 – Christie Pearce, American footballer
 June 25
 Linda Cardellini, American actress
 Natasha Klauss, Colombian actress
 Vladimir Kramnik, Russian chess player
 June 26 – Florence Loiret Caille, French actress
 June 27
 Mufti Menk, Zimbabwean Muslim cleric and Mufti
 Tobey Maguire, American actor
 Mosese Rauluni, Fijian rugby union footballer
 June 28
 Jeff Geddis, Canadian film and television actor
 Ning Baizura, Malaysian singer
 Jon Nödtveidt, Swedish singer (d. 2006)
 June 29 – Mime Gopi, Indian actor
 June 30
 James Bannatyne, New Zealand footballer
 Ralf Schumacher, German racing driver
 Angela Tong, Hong Kong actress

July

 July 1 – Sufjan Stevens, American musician
 July 2 – Stefan Terblanche, South African rugby union player 
 July 3 – Ryan McPartlin, American actor
 July 4 – John Lloyd Young, American actor and singer
 July 5
 Zander de Bruyn, South African cricketer
 Hernán Crespo, Argentinian footballer
 Surya Saputra, Indonesian actor, singer, and model
 Alberto Castillo, Cuban baseball pitcher
 Ai Sugiyama, Japanese tennis player
 July 6 
 Sebastián Rulli, Argentine actor and model
 Alessandro Juliani, Canadian actor and singer
 July 7
 Nina Hoss, German actress
 Camille Sullivan, Canadian actress
 July 8 
 Amara, Indonesian actress, model, and singer 
 Régis Laconi, French motorcycle racer
 Květa Peschke, Czech tennis player
 Elias Viljanen, Finnish musician
 July 9
 Shelton Benjamin, American professional wrestler
 Gaizka Garitano, Spanish football player and coach
 Damián Szifron, Argentine director and screenwriter
 Jack White, American singer and guitarist
 July 10
 Martina Colombari, Italian actress, model and television presenter
 Edoardo Gabbriellini, Italian actor, screenwriter, and director
 Stefán Karl Stefánsson, Icelandic actor (d. 2018)
 July 12 - Cheyenne Jackson, American actor and singer 
 July 15 – K Brosas, Filipino actress, comedian, singer and television host
 July 16 
 Ana Paula Arósio, Brazilian actress and model
 Edoardo Gabbriellini, Italian actor, screenwriter, and director
 July 17
 Elena Anaya, Spanish actress
 Darude, Finnish DJ and record producer
 Cécile de France, Belgian actress
 Loretta Harrop, Australian triathlete
 Terence Tao, Australian-American mathematician
 July 18 – Daron Malakian, Armenian-American guitarist
 July 19 – Kamijo, Japanese singer-songwriter, musician, and music producer
 July 20
 Judy Greer, American actress and author
 Ray Allen, American basketball player
 July 21 
David Dastmalchian, American actor
Fredrik Johansson, Swedish musician
 July 23 – Suriya, Indian actor
 July 25 – Evgeni Nabokov, Kazakh-Russian hockey goaltender
 July 26 – Liz Truss, English politician, Prime Minister of the United Kingdom September/October 2022
 July 27 – Alex Rodriguez, American baseball player
 July 28 – Leonor Watling, Spanish actress and singer

August

 August 1 – Danny Chan Kwok-kwan, Hong Kong actor
 August 3 – Wael Gomaa, Egyptian footballer
 August 4 
 Jason Crump, Australian motorcycle speedway rider
 Eicca Toppinen, Finnish cellist
 August 6 – Renate Götschl, Austrian alpine skier
 August 7
 Gaahl (Kristian Eivind Espedal), Norwegian musician
 Megan Gale, Australian model and actress
 Charlize Theron, South African-born American actress
 August 9 – Mahesh Babu, Indian actor
 August 12 – Casey Affleck, American actor and film director
 August 13 – Shoaib Akhtar, Pakistani fast bowler
 August 15 – Kara Wolters, American basketball player
 August 16 – Taika Waititi, New Zealand filmmaker, actor, and comedian
 August 18 – Kaitlin Olson, American actress
 August 21 – Alicia Witt, American actress and musician
 August 22 – Rodrigo Santoro, Brazilian actor
 August 25 – Petria Thomas, Australian swimmer
 August 29 – Dante Basco, American film, television and voice actor
 August 30 - Radhi Jaidi, Tunisian footballer
 August 31 – Sara Ramirez, Mexican-American actress

September

 September 1
 Maritza Rodríguez, Colombian actress and model
 Natalie Bassingthwaighte, Australian actress and singer
 Scott Speedman, Canadian actor
 September 3 – Redfoo, American disc jockey
 September 4 – Mark Ronson, English DJ, record producer, and singer
 September 6 – Ryoko Tani, Japanese judoka
 September 7 – Renato Sobral, Brazilian martial artist
 September 8 – Elena Likhovtseva, Russian tennis player
 September 9 – Michael Bublé, Canadian musician
 September 13 
 Peter Ho, American-Taiwanese singer and actor
 Idan Tal, Israeli footballer 
 September 16 – Gal Fridman, Israeli windsurfer
 September 17 – Jimmie Johnson, American race car driver
 September 18
 Charlie Finn, American film, television, and voice actor
 Jason Sudeikis, American actor, comedian, and screenwriter
 September 20
 Asia Argento, Italian actress, singer, and director
 Moon Bloodgood, American actress
 September 22 – Ethan Moreau, Canadian hockey player
 September 23
 Kim Dong-moon, South Korean badminton player
 Sergey Tetyukhin, Russian volleyball player
 September 25 – Matt Hasselbeck, American football player
 September 28 – Ana Brnabić, Prime Minister of Serbia
 September 30
 Marion Cotillard, French actress, singer, songwriter, and musician
 Ta-Nehisi Coates, American author and journalist
 Glenn Fredly, Indonesian singer-songwriter (d. 2020)
 Wopke Hoekstra, Dutch politician

October

 October 1 – Bimba Bosé, Spanish model, actress and singer (d. 2017)
 October 3 – Alanna Ubach, American actress and singer
 October 5
 Parminder Nagra, British actress
 Kate Winslet, British actress
 Gao Yuanyuan, Chinese actress
 October 6 – Martin Jørgensen, Danish football player and coach
 October 7 – Rhyno, American professional wrestler
 October 8 – Marc Molinaro, American politician
 October 9 – Sean Lennon, British-American musician, songwriter, producer and multi-instrumentalist
 October 10 – Ihsahn, Norwegian musician
 October 12 – Marion Jones, American athlete
 October 14
 Floyd Landis, American cyclist
 Shaznay Lewis, English singer
 October 15 – Michél Mazingu-Dinzey, German-Congolese footballer 
 October 16 – Jacques Kallis, South African cricketer
 October 17 – McLain Ward, American equestrian
 October 21
 Henrique Hilário, Portuguese footballer
 Madchild, Canadian rapper 
 October 22 
 Jesse Tyler Ferguson, American actor
 Míchel Salgado, Spanish footballer
 October 23 – Odalys García, Cuban actress
 October 25 – Zadie Smith, English writer
 October 27 – Aron Ralston, American outdoorsman, mechanical engineer and motivational speaker
 October 28 – Krisztián Zahorecz, Hungarian football player (d. 2019)
 October 29 – Frank Baumann, German footballer
 October 30 – Ian D'Sa, Canadian guitarist
 October 31 – Director X, Canadian music video director

November

 November 2 – Danny Cooksey, American actor and comedian
 November 3 – Marta Domínguez, Spanish athlete
 November 4
 Éric Fichaud, Canadian hockey player
 Justine Waddell, South African-British actress
 Lorenzen Wright, American basketball player (d. 2010)
 November 5
 Lisa Scott-Lee, Welsh singer
 Jamie Spaniolo (Jamie Madrox), American rapper
 November 7 – Marcus Luttrell, American U.S. Navy Seal
 November 8
 Ángel Corella, Spanish dancer
 Tara Reid, American actress
 November 10 – Markko Märtin, Estonian racing driver
 November 11
 Daisuke Ohata, Japanese rugby union player
 Angélica Vale, Mexican-American actress, singer, and comedian
 November 12 
 Jason Lezak, American swimmer
 Dario Šimić, Croatian footballer
 November 13 – Ivica Dragutinović, Serbian footballer
 November 14
 Luizão, Brazilian footballer
 Gary Vaynerchuk, American-Belarusian entrepreneur and internet personality
 November 16 – Julio Lugo, Dominican baseball player
 November 18
 Neal E. Boyd, American singer and reality show winner (America's Got Talent) (d. 2018)
 Altin Lala, Albanian footballer
 Anthony McPartlin, British TV presenter, actor and singer
 David Ortiz, Dominican-American baseball player
 November 19 – Sushmita Sen, Indian actress and model, former Miss Universe.
 November 20
 Dierks Bentley, American country music singer
 Joshua Gomez, American actor
 November 21
 Cherie Johnson, American actress
 Chris Moneymaker, American poker player
 Aaron Solowoniuk, Canadian drummer
 November 22 – Yusaku Maezawa, Japanese billionaire entrepreneur and art collector
 November 24 – Lee Wan Wah, Malaysian badminton player
 November 26 – DJ Khaled, American DJ, record executive, songwriter, record producer and media personality
 November 28 – Eka Kurniawan, Indonesian writer
 November 30
 Mindy McCready, American country music singer (d. 2013)
 Ben Thatcher, Welsh footballer

December

 

 December 3 – Csaba Czébely, Hungarian drummer
 December 5
 Sofi Marinova, Bulgarian singer
 Ronnie O'Sullivan, British snooker player
 Paula Patton, American actress
 December 6 – Ashin, Taiwanese singer
 December 8 – Kevin Harvick, American race car driver
 December 10 – Emmanuelle Chriqui, Canadian actress
 December 12
 Mayim Bialik, Israeli-American actress and neuroscientist
 Houko Kuwashima, Japanese voice actress 
 December 13 – Tom DeLonge, American musician, author, and UFOlogist
 December 17
 Tim Clark, South African golfer
 Nick Dinsmore, American professional wrestler
 Susanthika Jayasinghe, Sri Lankan athlete
 Hilje Murel, Estonian actress
 Milla Jovovich, Ukrainian-born American actress and model
 December 18
 Mara Carfagna, Italian politician and model
 Sia, Australian singer-songwriter and music video director
 Trish Stratus, Canadian professional wrestler and model
 December 20 – Bartosz Bosacki, Polish footballer
 December 21
 Paloma Herrera, Argentine ballet dancer
 Charles Michel, Belgian politician, 51st Prime Minister of Belgium and President of the European Council
 December 23 – Vadim Sharifijanov, Russian ice hockey player
 December 24 – Maria Zakharova, Russian politician and diplomat
 December 26 
 Ed Stafford, English explorer
 Marcelo Ríos, Chilean tennis player
 December 27 – Heather O'Rourke, American child actress (d. 1988)
 December 29 – Shawn Hatosy, American actor
 December 30 – Tiger Woods, American golfer

Deaths

January

 January 3 – Victor Kraft, Austrian philosopher (b. 1880)
 January 5 – Gottlob Berger, German Nazi senior official (b. 1896)
 January 9 – Pierre Fresnay, French actor (b. 1897)
 January 14 – Georgi Traykov, former head of State of Bulgaria as Chairman of the Presidium of the National Assembly (b. 1898)	
 January 17 – Gustavo Rojas Pinilla, 19th President of Colombia (b. 1900)
 January 19 – Thomas Hart Benton, American artist (b. 1889)
 January 23 – Prince Karl Franz of Prussia (b. 1916)
 January 24 – Larry Fine, American actor and comedian (b. 1902)
 January 27 
 Antonín Novotný, Czechoslovak Communist leader and 7th President of Czechoslovakia (b. 1904)
 Bill Walsh, American film producer and writer (b. 1913)
 January 28 – Ola Raknes, Norwegian psychoanalyst and philologist (b. 1887)

February

 February 3 – Umm Kulthum, Egyptian actress and singer (b. 1898)
 February 4 – Louis Jordan, American musician (b. 1908)
 February 8 
 Sir Robert Robinson, British chemist, Nobel Prize laureate (b. 1886)
 Jan Mukařovský, Czech literary, linguistic and aesthetic theorist. (b. 1891)
 February 10 – Dave Alexander, American musician (b. 1947)
 February 14 
 Sir Julian Huxley, British biologist (b. 1887)
 Sir P. G. Wodehouse, English writer (b. 1881)
 February 16 – Morgan Taylor, American Olympic athlete (b. 1903)
 February 17 – Hugo Österman, Finnish general (b. 1892)
 February 18 – Chivu Stoica, Romanian Communist politician, 48th Prime Minister of Romania and head of State (b. 1908)
 February 19 – Luigi Dallapiccola, Italian composer (b. 1904)
 February 22 – Lionel Tertis, English violist (b. 1876)
 February 24 – Nikolai Bulganin, Premier of the Soviet Union (b. 1895)
 February 25 – Elijah Muhammad, American Nation of Islam leader (b. 1897)

March

 March 2 – Madeleine Vionnet, French fashion designer (b. 1876)
 March 3 – Therese Giehse, German actress (b. 1898)
 March 6 – Glenn Hardin, American athlete (b. 1910)
 March 7 – Mikhail Bakhtin, Russian philosopher and literary scholar (b. 1895)
 March 8
 Joseph Bech, Prime Minister of Luxembourg (b. 1887)
 George Stevens, American director, producer and cinematographer (b. 1904)
 March 9 – Shirley Ross, American actress and singer (b. 1913)
 March 11 – Margarita Fischer, American silent film actress (b. 1886)
 March 13 – Ivo Andrić, Serbo-Croatian writer, Nobel Prize laureate (b. 1892)
 March 14 – Susan Hayward, American actress (b. 1917)
 March 15 – Aristotle Onassis, Greek shipping magnate (b. 1906)
 March 16 – T-Bone Walker, American blues performer (b. 1910)
 March 19 – Harry Lachman, American set designer and film director (b. 1886)
 March 20 – Infante Jaime, Duke of Segovia (b. 1908)
 March 21 - Joe Medwick, American baseball player and manager (b. 1911) 
 March 25
 King Faisal of Saudi Arabia (b. 1906)
 Michèle Girardon, French actress (b. 1938)
 March 27 – Sir Arthur Bliss, British composer and Master of the Queen's Music (b. 1891)
 March 30 – Boots Adams, American business magnate, president of Phillips Petroleum Company (b. 1899)

April

 April 5
 Chiang Kai-shek, Chinese nationalist general and politician, 1st President of the Republic of China (b. 1887)
 Harold Osborn, American Olympic athlete (b. 1899)
 Victor Marijnen, Dutch politician and jurist, 40th Prime Minister of the Netherlands (b. 1917)
 April 10
 Walker Evans, American photographer (b. 1903)
 Marjorie Main, American actress (b. 1890)
 April 12 – Josephine Baker, France entertainer, activist (b. 1906)
 April 14 – Fredric March, American actor (b. 1897)
 April 17 – Sarvepalli Radhakrishnan, Indian philosopher and politician, 2nd President of India (b. 1888)
 April 23 - William Hartnell, English actor (b. 1908)
 April 24 – Pete Ham, Welsh singer, songwriter and guitarist (b. 1947)
 April 30
 Lê Nguyên Vỹ, South Vietnamese Army general (b. 1933)
 Lê Văn Hưng, South Vietnamese Army general (b. 1933)
 Nguyễn Khoa Nam, South Vietnamese Army general (b. 1927)
 Phạm Văn Phú, South Vietnamese Army general (b. 1927)

May

 May 1 – Trần Văn Hai, South Vietnamese Army general (b. 1927)
 May 4 – Moe Howard, American actor and comedian (b. 1897)
 May 8 – Avery Brundage, American administrator, 5th President of the International Olympic Committee (b. 1887)
 May 9 – Philip Dorn, Dutch actor (b. 1901)
 May 14 – Ernst Alexanderson, Swedish-born American television pioneer (b. 1878)
 May 18
 Leroy Anderson, American composer (b. 1908)
 Aníbal Troilo, Argentine tango musician (b. 1914)
 May 20 – Dame Barbara Hepworth, English sculptor and artist (b. 1903)
 May 22
 Lefty Grove, American baseball player (b. 1900)
 Torben Meyer, Danish actor (b. 1884)
 May 28 
 Ezzard Charles, American boxer, former World Heavyweight Champion (b. 1921)
 Lung Chien, Chinese screenwriter and film director (b. 1916)
 May 30
 Steve Prefontaine, American distance runner (b. 1951)
 Michel Simon, Swiss actor (b. 1895)

June

 June 3
 Eisaku Satō, Japanese politician, Prime Minister of Japan, recipient of the Nobel Peace Prize (b. 1901)
 Ozzie Nelson, American actor, director and producer (b. 1906)
 June 4 – Evelyn Brent, American actress (b. 1899)
 June 9 – Albert Spencer, 7th Earl Spencer, British aristocrat (b. 1898)
 June 12 – Rafael Arévalo Martínez, Guatemalan writer (b. 1884)
 June 13 – José María Guido, 33rd President of Argentina (b. 1910)
 June 15 – William Austin, English actor (b. 1884)
 June 18 – Hugo Bergmann, German and Israeli Jewish philosopher (b. 1883)
 June 27 – G. I. Taylor, British physicist, mathematician and expert on fluid dynamics and wave theory (b. 1886)
 June 28 – Rod Serling, American television screenwriter and narrator (b. 1924)
 June 29 – Tim Buckley, American singer-songwriter (b. 1947)

July

 July 2 – James Robertson Justice, British actor (b. 1907)
 July 4 – Luigi Carlo Borromeo, Italian Roman Catholic bishop (b. 1893)
 July 10 – Achille Van Acker, 33rd Prime Minister of Belgium (b. 1898)
 July 14 – Madan Mohan, Indian music director (b. 1924)
 July 17 – Konstantine Gamsakhurdia, Georgian writer and public benefactor (b. 1893)
 July 19 – Lefty Frizzell, American singer (b. 1928)
 July 21 – Billy West, American actor (b. 1892)
 July 23 – Emlen Tunnell, American football player and coach (b. 1924)
 July 30 – James Blish, American science fiction and fantasy writer (b. 1921)

August

 August 3
 Andreas Embirikos, Greek poet (b. 1901)
 Jack Molinas, American basketball player (b. 1931)
 August 6 – Infante Alfonso, Duke of Galliera, Spanish prince, military aviator (b. 1886)
 August 9 – Dmitri Shostakovich, Soviet and Russian composer (b. 1906)
 August 10 – Anthony McAuliffe, American general (b. 1898)
 August 11 – Rachel Katznelson-Shazar, Zionist political figure and wife of third President of Israel (b. 1885)
 August 15 – Sheikh Mujibur Rahman, 2nd Prime Minister of Bangladesh and 1st and 4th President of Bangladesh (b. 1920)
 August 16 – Vladimir Kuts, Soviet runner (b. 1927)
 August 17 – Sig Arno, German actor (b. 1895)
 August 19
 Mark Donohue, American race car driver (b. 1937)
 Ima Hogg, American society leader, philanthropist, patron and collector of the arts (b. 1882)
 Frank Shields, American tennis player (b. 1909)
 August 23 – Sidney Buchman, American screenwriter (b. 1902)
 August 25 – Joseph Kane, American film director and producer (b. 1894)
 August 26 – Cullen Landis, American actor (b. 1896)
 August 27 – Haile Selassie I, Emperor of Ethiopia (b. 1892)
 August 28 – Fritz Wotruba, Austrian sculptor (b. 1907)
 August 29 
Charles C. Bass, American physician and medical researcher (b. 1875)
Éamon de Valera, Irish politician and statesman, 3rd President of Ireland and 3-time Taoiseach (b. 1882)

September

 September 5 – Alice Catherine Evans, American microbiologist (b. 1881)
 September 9
 Minta Durfee, American actress (b. 1889)
 Ethel Griffies, British actress (b. 1878)
 September 10 – Sir George Paget Thomson, British physicist, Nobel Prize laureate (b. 1892)
 September 15 – Pavel Sukhoi, Soviet aerospace engineer, twice Hero of Socialist Labour (b. 1895)
 September 19 – Pamela Brown, English actress (b. 1917)
 September 20 
Doria Shafik, Egyptian feminist, poet, writer and editor (b. 1908)
Saint-John Perse, French diplomat and writer, Nobel Prize laureate (b. 1887)
 September 23 – Ian Hunter, British actor (b. 1900)
 September 26 – C. H. Waddington, British biologist, paleontologist, geneticist and philosopher (b. 1905)
 September 27 
 Mark Frechette, American actor (b. 1947)
 Jack Lang, Australian politician (b. 1876)
 September 29 – Casey Stengel, American baseball player and manager (b. 1890)

October

 October 3 – Guy Mollet, 94th Prime Minister of France (b. 1905)
 October 4 – May Sutton, American tennis champion (b. 1886)
 October 10 – Norman Levinson, American mathematician (b. 1912)
 October 22 – Arnold J. Toynbee, English historian (b. 1889)
 October 27 
 Peregrino Anselmo, Uruguayan football player (b. 1902)
 Rex Stout, American author (b. 1886)
 October 28 – Georges Carpentier, French boxer (b. 1894)
 October 30 – Gustav Ludwig Hertz, German physicist, Nobel Prize laureate (b. 1887)

November

 November 1 – C. S. Wright, Canadian explorer (b. 1887)
 November 2 – Pier Paolo Pasolini, Italian film director (b. 1922)
 November 4 – Francis Dvornik, Czech historian (b. 1893)
 November 5 –  Lionel Trilling, American literary critic (b. 1905)
 November 6 
 Ernst Hanfstaengl, German-born American businessman and politician (b. 1887)
 Annette Kellerman, Australian swimmer and actress (b. 1887)
 November 13 – R. C. Sherriff, English writer (b. 1896)
 November 17 – Kay Johnson, American actress (b. 1904)
 November 20 – Francisco Franco, Spanish general and politician, Prime Minister of Spain (b. 1892)
 November 29
 Tony Brise, English racing driver (b. 1952)
 Graham Hill, English racing driver (b. 1929)

December

 December 4 – Hannah Arendt, German political theorist (b. 1906)
 December 7 – Thornton Wilder, American playwright (b. 1897)
 December 8 – Plínio Salgado, Brazilian politician and writer (b. 1895)
 December 9 – William A. Wellman, American film director (b. 1896)
 December 10 – Andrew "Boy" Charlton, Australian Olympic swimmer (b. 1907)
 December 12 – Saadi Al Munla, 4th Prime Minister of Lebanon (b. 1890)
 December 14 – Arthur Treacher, English actor (b. 1894)
 December 15
 Alex Aronson, Jewish-Dutch aid worker (b. 1934)
 Shigeyoshi Inoue, Japanese admiral (b. 1889)
 December 17 – Noble Sissle, American jazz composer (b. 1889)
 December 18 – Theodosius Dobzhansky, Ukrainian-American geneticist and evolutionary biologist (b. 1900)
 December 19 – René Maheu, French professor and administrator, 6th Director-General of UNESCO (b. 1905)
 December 20 – William Lundigan, American actor (b. 1914)
 December 21 – Rowland V. Lee, American film director (b. 1891)
 December 24 – Bernard Herrmann, American composer (b. 1911)
 December 30 – Elene Akhvlediani, Soviet painter (b. 1901)

Date unknown
 Sisowath Monireth, 3rd Prime Minister of Cambodia (b. 1909)

Nobel Prizes

 Physics – Aage Bohr, Ben Roy Mottelson, James Rainwater
 Chemistry – John Cornforth, Vladimir Prelog
 Medicine – David Baltimore, Renato Dulbecco, Howard Martin Temin
 Literature – Eugenio Montale
 Peace – Andrei Dmitrievich Sakharov
 Economics – Leonid Kantorovich, Tjalling Koopmans

References